First Experience is the debut album by Hong Kong singer Jason Chan released in 2007.

Track listing

Collector edition
Jason Chan released First Experience: Collector Edition on October 29, 2007. The album contains same tracks plus 2 additional tracks and a DVD.

References

2007 albums
Jason Chan (singer) albums